The 1939 Summer Deaflympics officially known as 5th International Silent Games, was an international multi-sport event that was held from 24 to 27 August 1939 in Stockholm, Sweden.

Participating Countries
The following countries participated in the 1939 Deaflympics:
 Belgium
 Denmark
 Estonia
 Finland
 France
 Germany
 Great Britain
 Latvia
 Norway
 Poland
 Romania
 Sweden
 United States of America

Sports
The following events were included in the 1939 Deaflympics:

Individual sports 
  Athletics
  Road cycling
  Diving
  Shooting
  Swimming
  Tennis

Team sports 
 Football

Medal table

Results

Athletics

Cycling

Diving

Football

Shooting

Swimming

Tennis

Notes

References 

Deaflympics
1939 in Swedish sport
International sports competitions hosted by Sweden
August 1939 sports events